The mayor of Las Piñas is the head of the executive branch of Las Piñas government. The mayor holds office at the Las Piñas City Hall.

Like all local government heads in the Philippines, the mayor is elected via popular vote, and may not be elected for a fourth consecutive term (although the former mayor may return to office after an interval of one term). In case of death, resignation or incapacity, the vice mayor becomes the mayor.

List

 Served in acting capacity. 

Las Piñas
Las Piñas
Politics of Las Piñas